Charles Houghton may refer to:

 Charles H. Houghton (1842–1914), Union Army soldier and Medal of Honor recipient
 Charles Frederick Houghton (1839–1898), Canadian rancher, justice of the peace, politician and soldier